The Herald is a state-owned daily newspaper published in Harare, the capital of Zimbabwe.

History

Origins
The newspaper's origins date back to the 19th century. Its forerunner was launched on 27 June 1891 by William Fairbridge for the Argus group of South Africa. Named the Mashonaland Herald and Zambesian Times, it was a weekly, hand-written news sheet produced using the cyclostyle duplicating process. In October the following year it became a printed newspaper and changed its name to The Rhodesia Herald.

The Argus group later set up a subsidiary called the Rhodesian Printing and Publishing Company to run its newspapers in what was then Southern Rhodesia.

After the white minority Rhodesian Front government unilaterally declared independence on 11 November 1965, it started censoring The Rhodesia Herald. The newspaper responded by leaving blank spaces where articles had been removed, enabling readers to gauge the extent of the censorship.

Post Independence
In 1981, after Zimbabwe became independent, the government bought The Herald and other papers from the Argus group, using a US$20 million grant from Nigeria, and established the Zimbabwe Mass Media Trust to operate them. The Trust created Zimbabwe Newspapers, Ltd., as the publisher of the papers.

In mid-May 2008, its website was briefly shut down by cyber hackers.

For Robert Mugabe's 93rd birthday, the state-owned newspaper issued a 24-page supplement packed with goodwill messages from government departments.

Sister papers
Other newspapers published by the same group include The Sunday Mail in Harare, The Chronicle and Sunday News in Bulawayo and the Manica Post in Mutare. The Chronicle, launched in October 1894 as The Bulawayo Chronicle, is the second oldest newspaper in the country.

Controversy
The Herald has for some time been noted for its slant in favor of President Robert Mugabe and the Zanu-PF party, and its demonisation of the opposition party, the Movement for Democratic Change (MDC). It often accuses the MDC of being agents of colonial powers.

The Herald faces limited competition from within Zimbabwe, mainly from independent newspapers, such as The Independent, due to very restrictive accreditation laws. Many opposition media claim that the paper has evolved into an instrument of rather crude and aggressive propaganda. The editorial staff are open in their partisanship.

Editors 

 1892–1896: William Fairbridge
 1898–1903: T. Shillington
 1911–1915: C. D. Don
 1915–1927: R. H. Douglas
 1927–1931: W. Addison
 1931–1955: Norman Ferris
 1956–1962: C. J. Cowan
 1962–1967: Malcom Smith
 1967–1970: Sydney Swadel
 1970–1974: Rhys Meier
 1975–1980: Roland Fothergill
 1980–1981: Robin Drew
 1981–1982: Farayi Munyuki
 1983–1998: Tommy Sithole
 1998–2000: Bornwell Chakaodza
 2000–2001: Ray Mungoshi
 2001–2009: Pikirayi Deketeke
 2009–2012: William Chikoto
 2012–2013: Innocent Gore
 2013–2018: Caesar Zvayi
 2018–2019: Joram Nyathi
 2019: Tichaona Zindoga (acting)
 2019–2020: William Chikoto (acting)
 2020–present: Hatred Zenenga

Notable staff 

 Davison Maruziva, deputy editor
 Geoffrey Nyarota, hired in 1978 as one of the paper's first black reporters 
 Chipo Sabeta, senior sports reporter
 William Saidi, early 1980s
 Angus Shaw, 1972–1974

See also
 British South Africa Company Government Gazette (originally published as a supplement to The Herald.)
 Mass media in Zimbabwe
 List of newspapers in Zimbabwe

References

External links 
  The Herald newspaper website

Newspapers published in Zimbabwe
Mass media in Harare
Publications established in 1891
1891 establishments in Southern Rhodesia